Karol Mészáros (born 25 July 1993) is a Slovak football player who currently plays for FC Slovan Liberec.

Career
Mészáros started his career with Senec, later FC Jelka and at the age of fourteen years he moved to Bratislava-based Inter. He won the Slovak U15 league Inter. He then transferred to the rivalling Slovan Bratislava. He made his debut in a pre-season friendly against PŠC Pezinok, replacing Juraj Halenár. The league season began well for Mészáros, as he made a debut with a splendid assist for Ondřej Smetana, netting the opener in a 3–1 home win against Dunajská Streda. On 11 March 2012 he scored his first goal for Slovan against Košice in a 1–0 win. In January 2013, Mészáros was sent to ViOn Zlaté Moravce on a half-year loan to achieve greater playing time.

External links
Slovan Bratislava profile

References

1993 births
Living people
People from Galanta
Sportspeople from the Trnava Region
Slovak footballers
Slovak expatriate footballers
Slovakia under-21 international footballers
Slovak people of Hungarian descent
Association football forwards
ŠK Slovan Bratislava players
FC ViOn Zlaté Moravce players
Slovak Super Liga players
Puskás Akadémia FC players
Debreceni VSC players
Szombathelyi Haladás footballers
Újpest FC players
Nemzeti Bajnokság I players
SK Dynamo České Budějovice players
FC Slovan Liberec players
Czech First League players
Expatriate footballers in Hungary
Slovak expatriate sportspeople in Hungary
Expatriate footballers in the Czech Republic
Slovak expatriate sportspeople in the Czech Republic